The Rwanda asylum plan (officially the UK and Rwanda Migration and Economic Development Partnership, also known as the Rwanda asylum scheme, Rwanda plan and Rwanda deal) is an immigration policy first proposed by the British government, whereby people identified by the United Kingdom as being illegal immigrants or asylum seekers will be relocated to Rwanda for processing, asylum and resettlement. Those successful in claiming asylum will remain in Rwanda and not be permitted to return to the United Kingdom.

The first flight under this plan received legal clearance from the High Court and was scheduled for 14 June 2022. A last-minute interim measure by the European Court of Human Rights led to the plan being halted until the conclusion of the legal action in the UK.  At the end of 2022, the High Court further ruled that though the plan is lawful, the individual cases of eight asylum seekers due to be deported that year, had to be reconsidered.

Description 
The UK and Rwanda Migration and Economic Development Partnership, also known as the Rwanda asylum plan, is a policy that was announced in a speech by British prime minister Boris Johnson. It is an immigration policy whereby people identified by the United Kingdom as being illegal immigrants or asylum seekers will be relocated to Rwanda for processing, asylum and resettlement. It was enacted for a duration of five years by British home secretary Priti Patel and Rwandan foreign minister Vincent Biruta on 13 April 2022. Its stated aims are to decrease the amount of migrant crossings in the English channel, stop human smuggling, and boost Rwandan investment and development. Johnson said it would "save countless lives" and would break the business model of "vile people smugglers". The United Kingdom will pay Rwanda an "economic transformation and integration fund" amounting to £120 million, and will also fund each immigrant between £20,000 and £30,000 for their relocation and temporary accommodation in the scheme. The agreement with the Rwandan government does not specify how many migrants will be accepted under the scheme but it has subsequently been reported that the initial maximum will be 200. In comparison, net migration to the UK rose to a record high of around 504,000 in the year to June 2022, driven by an increase in the number of non-European Union nationals. The government registered 45,755 people arriving by small boats in 2022, 60% higher than in 2021, according to the Home Office. That has led to a record backlog of 161,000 asylum cases.

Upon arrival in Rwanda, migrants will be temporarily accommodated in the capital Kigali as their claims for asylum are processed. If successful, migrants will then receive permanent residency in the country and be offered permanent accommodation. It is expected that all claims will, at most, take three months to be processed. Once in Rwanda, migrants will not be allowed to return to the United Kingdom to seek asylum.

The United Kingdom has stated that asylum in the country will still be granted on an individual basis, although that depends on the strength of each claim. Rwanda has stated that they will not accept immigrants with criminal records, nor will it accept families or anyone under the age of majority.

Application 

On 14 May 2022, Johnson said in an interview with the Daily Mail that fifty migrants had been told that they would be transported to Rwanda over the next two weeks, and that his government was ready for legal opposition to the plan's enforcement. 

The first flight under this plan was scheduled for 14 June 2022 and was expected to carry more than 30 people. By 14 June, the number of people expected on the flight had been reduced to seven after successful legal challenges had removed a number of people from it. On the evening of 14 June it was confirmed the flight would no longer depart on that date following an interim measure from the European Court of Human Rights. Home Secretary Priti Patel said that she was "disappointed" by the outcome and that preparations for "the next flight" were to begin immediately.

Legal challenge 

Two campaign groups – Detention Action and Care4Calais – joined the PCS Union and four asylum seekers to challenge the plan in the High Court and request a last-minute injunction to stop the first flight from taking off on 14 June 2022. However, on 10 June 2022 the High Court refused to grant the injunction requested.

At 19:30 on the day of the planned flight, the European Court of Human Rights issued an interim measure which stated that one of its seven passengers, an Iraqi man, would face "a real risk of irreversible harm" if he was transported to Rwanda. That interim measure led the other six passengers to appeal, some to judges in London. The removal orders were scrapped and the flight was cancelled.
After the ECHR intervention, some political figures called for the UK to leave the ECHR.

On 19 December 2022, the High Court of the United Kingdom ruled that the British government's plan to send asylum seekers to Rwanda while their application is ongoing is lawful.

Reception

United Kingdom 
A YouGov poll, reported on 14 April 2022, found that 42% of those questioned disagreed with the plan, while 35% were in support. Results differed depending on what political party members of the public supported. The majority of Conservative supporters agreed with the scheme, whereas the majority of Brexiteers, Remainers, Liberal Democrat supporters and Labour supporters were opposed. Labour voters in the Red Wall and Wales were most likely to agree with the policy out of the party's supporters. People in Scotland and London, as well as young people nationwide, opposed the scheme the most. In contrast, the elderly gave it the most support. By 13 June 2022, a YouGov poll reported that 44% of those questioned supported the plan, and that 40% were opposed to it.

Demonstrations were held outside the Home Office the day the policy was announced and charities warned of Rwanda's human rights violations. The Rwanda deportation flight was to have been carried out by Privilege Style, a Spanish based charter operator who has previously conducted deportation flights for the Home Office. Seven airline operators have been identified as providing contract services for such flights the previous year.

As summarised by the Evening Standard on 15 April 2022, the Daily Mirror and the Guardian called the plan "inhumane", while the i  called it "cruel", and the Daily Mail called its critics "left-wing lawyers and naysayers".

Home Office under secretary, Matthew Rycroft was reported on 17 April 2022 to have expressed doubt over whether the plan will deter migrants or provide value for money while the home secretary, Priti Patel said that the prospect of being sent to Rwanda would disrupt the people-smuggling trade.

Archbishop Justin Welby said during an Easter Sunday sermon that the scheme raised "serious ethical questions" and did not stand "the judgement of God".

On 10 June 2022, The Times reported that Prince Charles had privately described the plan as "appalling" and feared that it would overshadow the Commonwealth Heads of Government meeting in Rwanda on 23 June, where the Prince represented the Queen.

On 15 June 2022, in an exchange in the House of Commons, Labour's Yvette Cooper criticised the scheme saying that in the past Rwanda had shot asylum seekers because they protested about food shortages, and had sent asylum seekers back to Syria and Afghanistan. She said Patel was failing to get a better agreement with France to prevent people crossing the Channel because relevant relationships with France broke down.

Speaking to GB News, the former home secretary Amber Rudd described the plan as being "brutal" and "impractical", saying that the UK government should try and improve relations with France to help deal with migrants crossing the English Channel to try and enter the UK.

Rwanda 
Rwandan President Paul Kagame has defended the asylum plan, dismissing allegations that "the U.K. gave Rwanda money to dump people here," further stating that it was "just a problem that needs to be solved and Rwanda is ready to help." He favourably compared the plan to his 2018 proposal to give asylum to Libyan refugees.

Victoire Ingabire Umuhoza, leader of the opposition in Rwanda, criticised the policy as dealing with British issues where Rwanda's problems should be dealt with first. She also claimed that Rwanda was not prepared for the new immigrants: "If our people don't have enough to eat, if our kids or Rwanda's kids don't have the possibility of going to school because of the poverty, how will the Rwandan government give education to the kids of refugees?"

Laurent Mbanda, the head of the Anglican Church of Rwanda, supported the plans. He said that the nation's people empathised with refugees due to their own experiences from the 1990s Rwandan genocide.

International 
The United Nations High Commissioner for Refugees (UNHCR) is "firmly opposed" to the policy, believing it to be unlawful, prejudiced and impractical. Its assistant high commissioner Gillian Triggs said the United Kingdom was "attempting to shift its burden to a developing country" and that the policy "would not comply with the UK's international legal responsibilities". Triggs has called for more options for legal immigration to be introduced to the United Kingdom.

Similar plans

Denmark 
Denmark has what has been described as a zero-refugees policy, under which it had passed legislation in 2021 for refugees to be sent outside the European Union to be processed; Kagame himself had spoken of talks with the Danish government for Rwanda to participate as early as April 2022.

On 18 August 2022, Denmark opened an office in Rwanda in preparation to move forward with its plan. By 9 September, both Denmark and Rwanda agreed to move forward with it. The plan was met with polarized reactions, facing condemnation both domestically and internationally, while also receiving support from parties across the political spectrum.

Other cases 
Sky News compared the UK's scheme to those in use by other countries. In addition to Denmark, it also described the "Pacific Solution" that Australia announced in 2001, under which refugees were to be sent to Papua New Guinea and Nauru; the scheme was modified in 2013 to deter refugees trying to arrive by boat. It also described how the EU had tried measures, including sending migrants to Niger, to try to stop migrants dying trying to cross the Mediterranean from Africa into EU countries. Under a plan by Israel, an African country (which was initially unnamed) agreed to accept up to 20,000 male migrants. An unknown number were deported, and Prime Minister Benjamin Netanyahu ultimately conceded that the country involved was Rwanda. Most of the men deported fled Rwanda, while others reported difficulty finding work. The scheme failed when the country's supreme court suspended deportations in 2018.

See also 

 Asylum seekers in the United Kingdom
 Externalization (migration)
 Human rights in the United Kingdom
 Illegal Migration Bill
 Illegal immigration to the United Kingdom
 Operation Sovereign Borders

References

External links
 Memorandum of Understanding between the government of the United Kingdom of Great Britain and Northern Ireland and the government of the Republic of Rwanda for the provision of an asylum partnership arrangement

2022 in British politics
2022 in Rwanda
Rwanda–United Kingdom relations
Right of asylum in the United Kingdom
Immigration to Rwanda
Boris Johnson